Julia Prinsep Stephen ( Jackson, formerly Duckworth; 7 February 1846 – 5 May 1895) was an English Pre-Raphaelite model and philanthropist. She was the wife of the biographer Leslie Stephen and mother of Virginia Woolf and Vanessa Bell, members of the Bloomsbury Group.

Julia Prinsep Jackson was born in Calcutta to an Anglo-Indian family, and when she was two her mother and her two sisters moved back to England. She became the favourite model of her aunt, the celebrated photographer Julia Margaret Cameron, who made more than 50 portraits of her. Through another maternal aunt, she became a frequent visitor at Little Holland House, then home to an important literary and artistic circle, and came to the attention of a number of Pre-Raphaelite painters who portrayed her in their work. 

Married to Herbert Duckworth, a barrister, in 1867 she was soon widowed with three infant children. Devastated, she turned to nursing, philanthropy and agnosticism, and found herself attracted to the writing and life of Leslie Stephen, with whom she shared a friend in Anny Thackeray, his sister-in-law.

After Leslie Stephen's wife died in 1875 he became close friends with Julia and they married in 1878. Julia and Leslie Stephen had four further children, living at 22 Hyde Park Gate, South Kensington, together with his seven-year-old mentally disabled daughter, Laura Makepeace Stephen. Many of her seven children and their descendants became notable. In addition to her family duties and modelling, she wrote a book based on her nursing experiences, Notes from Sick Rooms, in 1883. 

She also wrote children's stories for her family, eventually published posthumously as Stories for Children and became involved in social justice advocacy. Julia Stephen had firm views on the role of women, namely that their work was of equal value to that of men, but in different spheres, and she opposed the suffrage movement for votes for women. The Stephens entertained many visitors at their London home and their summer residence at St Ives, Cornwall. Eventually the demands on her both at home and outside the home started to take their toll. Julia Stephen died at her home following an episode of rheumatic fever in 1895, at the age of 49, when her youngest child was only 11. The writer Virginia Woolf provides a number of insights into the domestic life of the Stephens in both her autobiographical and fictional work.

Life

Family 

Julia Stephen was born in Calcutta, Bengal, then the capital of British India, on 7 February 1846, as Julia Prinsep Jackson. Her parents, Maria "Mia" Theodosia Pattle (1818–1892) and John Jackson (1804–1887), belonged to two Anglo-Indian families, although Maria's mother, Adeline Marie Pattle (née de l'Etang), was French. Her father was the third son of George Jackson and Mary Howard of Bengal, a Cambridge educated physician who spent 25 years (1830–1855) with the Bengal Medical Service and East India Company and a professor at the fledgling Calcutta Medical College. While Dr Jackson came from humble origins, but had a successful career that brought him into circles of influence, the Pattles moved naturally in the upper echelons of Anglo-Bengali society. Maria Pattle was the fifth of eight sisters famed for their beauty, verve and eccentricity, and who inherited some Bengali blood through their maternal grandmother, Thérèse Josephe Blin de Grincourt. They spoke Hindustani among themselves, and were a sensation on their visits to London and Paris. By contrast with the colourful Maria, Jackson was less overt, and tolerant of her passion for her friend, the poet Coventry Patmore. Jackson and Maria Pattle were married in Calcutta on 17 January 1837 and had six children, of whom Julia was the youngest, the third of three surviving daughters, Adeline Maria (1837–1881), Mary Louisa (1840–1916) and Julia (see Table of ancestors). They had two sons George and Corrie (1839–1841) and a daughter Julia (b. 1840), who died in infancy. The Jacksons were a well educated, literary, and artistic proconsular middle-class family.

Early life (1846–1867) 

Julia's two older sisters were sent to England for reasons of health in 1846 to stay with her mother's sister Sarah Monckton Pattle and her husband Henry Prinsep, who had recently leased Little Holland House in Kensington. Julia and her mother joined them in 1848 when Julia was two. Later the family moved to Well Walk, Hampstead. Her father followed them to England, from India, in 1855, the family living in Hendon at Brent Lodge on Brent Lane, where Julia was home schooled. Julia's sisters, Mary and Adeline were married shortly after. Adeline married Henry Vaughan ("Harry") in 1856 and Mary married Herbert Fisher in 1862, leaving Julia as her mother's companion and caretaker. Her mother's long history of ill health dates from around 1856, and Julia would accompany her on her travels to find remedies. On one of these, where they visited her sister (now Mary Fisher.) in Venice in 1862, she encountered her new brother-in-law's friend, Herbert Duckworth (1833−1870), whom she would later marry. In 1866 the Jacksons moved to Saxonbury, in Frant, near Tunbridge Wells. There she would meet the agnostic biographer Leslie Stephen (1832–1904) later that year, shortly before his engagement to Minny Thackeray. Stephen eventually became her second husband. He described Saxonbury as "a good country house with a pleasant garden and two or three fields".

The Pattle sisters and their families (see Pattle family tree) provided important connections for Julia and her mother. As Quentin Bell, Julia's grandson, described it, they had "a certain awareness of social possibilities". Sarah Monckton Pattle (1816-1887), had married Henry Thoby Prinse (1792–1878), an administrator with the East India Company, and their home at Little Holland House was an important intellectual centre and influence on Julia, that she would later describe to her children as "bohemian". Little Holland House, a farmhouse on the Holland estate, that served as the dower house, was then on the outskirts of London, and nicknamed the "Enchanted Palace", where Sarah Prinsep ran the equivalent of a French salon. Quentin Bell states that Julia was "largely brought up in" Little Holland House. The house was also frequented by Leslie Stephen. One of the Prinsep's sons, another of Julia's many cousins, was the artist, Valentine Cameron Prinsep (1838–1904). Another of Maria Jackson's sisters was Virginia Pattle (1827–1910), who married (1850) Lord Charles Eastnor, later the third Earl Somers (1819–1883). Their eldest daughter (Julia's cousin) was Lady Isabella Caroline Somers-Cocks (1851–1921), the temperance leader, while the younger, Lady Adeline Marie (1852–1920) became the Duchess of Bedford. Julia and her mother were frequent guests at Eastnor Castle, the home of Lord Charles and Lady Virginia. Another maternal aunt, and also her godmother, Julia Margaret Pattle (Julia Margaret Cameron 1815–1879), was a celebrated photographer, who took many photographs of her niece, and created a photograph album for her sister, Maria in 1863 (the Mia Album).

Sarah Prinsep, and her sisters, were adept at making great men feel at ease, and they frequented her house. There one might find Disraeli, Carlyle, Tennyson and Rossetti taking tea and playing croquet, while the painter George Frederic Watts (1817–1904) lived and worked there, as did for a while Edward Burne-Jones (1833–1898). It was at Little Holland House that Julia came to the attention of these Pre-Raphaelite painters and also William Holman Hunt (1827–1910), for all of whom she modelled as well as (see Gallery I) Frederick Leighton (1830–1896). She was also introduced to writers such as William Thackeray (1828–1909) and George Meredith (1828–1909), and formed a friendship with Thackeray's daughters, Anne (1837–1919) and Harriet Marian "Minny" (1840–1875). Julia was much admired, her mother observing that every man who met her in a railway carriage fell in love with her, and indeed everyone did love her. Leonard Woolf described her as "one of the most beautiful women in England". In 1864, at the age of 18, she declined marriage proposals from both Hunt and the sculptor, Thomas Woolner, another Pre-Raphaelite, who was devastated when she married three years later. Leslie Stephen remarked that Hunt only married his second wife, Edith Waugh, because she resembled Julia. Another sculptor for whom she modelled, and who was enamoured with her, was Carlo Marochetti (1805–1867). She was his model for the memorial to the young Princess Elizabeth (daughter of Charles I), when she was 10 years old, and he created a bust of Julia Jackson that is now at the Charleston Farmhouse, in Sussex. Throughout her life, she had no lack of admirers. These included the U.S. Ambassador, Russell Lowell.} and Henry James. At  she was tall for a Victorian woman and had large, practical hands, deriding "the lovely filbert nails which are the pride of many", shunning vanity, fashion and affectation.

Marriage

(1) Herbert Duckworth 1867–1870 

On 1 February 1867, at the age of 21, Julia became engaged to Herbert Duckworth, a member of the Somerset landed gentry,  a graduate of Cambridge University and Lincoln's Inn (1858), and now a barrister and they were married on 4 May at Frant. Julia Margaret Cameron took a number of portraits of her during this period, which Cameron considered symbolic of transition. The marriage was a happy one, Julia later stating "no one had tasted more perfect happiness...the greatest happiness that can fall to the lot of a woman". Julia's second husband, Leslie Stephen, had known Herbert Duckworth from when they were at Cambridge  together ten years earlier. He described him as "the kind of man who might be expected to settle down as a thorough country gentleman ... simple, straight forward and manly ... a singularly modest and sweet-tempered man". Leslie Stephen felt "a touch of pain" later, in writing about the purity of their love, commenting on her letters to Herbert, he stated that she "made a complete surrender of herself in the fullest sense: she would have no reserves from her lover, and confesses her entire devotion to him". As he read through Julia's letters to Herbert after her death, Leslie had misgivings in comparing "the strength of her passion" at this stage of her life to her later marriage to himself.

The Duckworths lived at 38 Bryanston Square (see images of exterior and interiors), Marylebone, London, a townhouse belonging to the Duckworth family, and the following year, their first child was born on 5 March 1868. Two other children followed in quick succession. Their third child, Gerald Duckworth, was born six weeks after his father's premature death in September 1870, at the age of 37, from an undiagnosed internal abscess. He was said to be reaching for a fig for her, while they were visiting Julia's sister (now Adeline Vaughan) at Upton Castle, New Milford, Pembrokeshire, when it ruptured. Within twenty-four hours, he was dead.

Julia and Herbert Duckworth had three children;
 George (5 March 1868 – 1934), a senior civil servant
 Stella (30 May 1869 – 1897), died aged 28
 Gerald (29 October 1870 – 1937), founder of Duckworth Publishing.

Mourning 1870–1878 

Married for only three years, Julia was devastated by her husband's death, lying on his grave at his family home of Orchardleigh, near Frome, Somerset. She stated that she was no longer "inclined to optimism", but rather taking on a "melancholy view of life", indeed, to her "life seemed a shipwreck...The world was clothed in drab shrouded in a crape-veil", but kept herself going for the sake of her children. She related this to Leslie Stephen later "I was only 24 when it all seemed a shipwreck, and I knew that I had to live on and on ... And so I got deadened". At the same time, her grief imbued her with a sense of stoicism and awareness of suffering and she made a decision to reject religion, and it appeared, the possibility of happiness. Leslie Stephen observed that "a cloud rested even upon her maternal affections ...it seemed to me at the time that she had accepted sorrow as her lifelong partner", and that "she was like a person reviving from drowning" and sometimes felt as if "she must let herself sink".

It was then that she took up nursing the sick and dying to make herself useful, and began studying the agnostic writing of Leslie Stephen. As Leslie Stephen described it "She became a kind of sister of mercy. Whenever there was trouble, death or illness in her family, the first thing was to send for Julia, whether to comfort survivors or to nurse the patients". After her husband's death, she joined her parents who had moved to Freshwater, Isle of Wight. It was also a period when she spent extensive visits to her aunt, Julia Margaret Cameron's home in Freshwater, who took many photographs of her (see Gallery II). She also resisted her aunt's efforts to persuade her to remarry.

Friendship to courtship 

Julia had become aware of Leslie Stephen through both his writings on agnosticism, and through a mutual friend, Anne Thackeray (Anny, 1837–1919), the writer and daughter of William Makepeace Thackeray (see Stephen family tree). Stephen had married Anny's younger sister Minny (Harriet Marian) Thackeray (1840–1875) in 1867, the same year as Julia's marriage, but she died in childbirth in 1875, leaving him with a handicapped daughter, Laura Makepeace Stephen (7 December 1870 – 1945). After Harriet's death, Stephen lived with Anny and he became closer to Julia, who helped them move to 11 Hyde Park Gate (when the house numbers were changed in 1884, it became number 20) in South Kensington in June 1876, next door to her at number 13 (later 22). This was a highly respectable part of London, and Leslie Stephen himself had been born at number 14 (later 42). It was hoped that Julia's children would provide some companionship for Laura, who was becoming increasingly difficult to manage, and in 1877 he made Julia one of Laura's guardians. Leslie Stephen and Julia Duckworth had developed a close friendship, as she added him to her list of those who needed caring for, and had visited Leslie and Minny the night of her death. Each was busy mourning, and saw the friendship as just that. In that friendship, they were able to share their ideals of sorrow, duty and spiritual convalescence. Leslie Stephen, a former Cambridge Don and man of letters, "knew everyone" in the literary and artistic scene, and came from a respectable upper-middle-class family of lawyers, country gentlemen and clergy.

In January 1877, Leslie Stephen decided he was in love with Julia, writing "There was a music running through me... delicious and inspiring. Julia was that strange solemn music to which my whole nature seemed to be set".  He proposed to her on 5 February; however, Anny also became engaged to her cousin at the same time, to his displeasure, although Julia intervened on Anny's behalf. Julia declined Leslie's offer of marriage and they agreed to remain friends, although developing an intense correspondence. At the time she entertained thoughts of committing herself to a life of chastity and the happiness she envisaged could be found in a convent. When Anny Thackeray married on 2 August 1877, Julia would soon change her mind, and it was a proposal to install a German housekeeper, Fraülein Klappert, that brought the matter to a head, for both realised this would separate them. Woolf would later speculate that "perhaps there was pity in her love" in addition to "devout admiration for his mind".

(2) Leslie Stephen 1878–1895 

On 5 January 1878, Julia Duckworth and Leslie Stephen became engaged, and on 26 March they were married at Kensington Church, although she spent much of the period in between nursing her uncle, Henry Prinsep, at Watts's house in Freshwater, till he died on 11 February. Julia was 32 and Leslie was 46. After spending several weeks visiting her sister, Virginia, at Eastnor Castle, Leslie and his seven-year-old daughter Laura moved next door to Julia's house at 13 (22) Hyde Park Gate (see image), where she continued to live for the rest of her life, and the family till her husband's death in 1904. Meanwhile, she continued her modelling career, Burne-Jones's Annunciation being completed in 1879, and their first child, Vanessa, was born shortly after on 30 May. Julia, having presented her husband with a child, and now having five children to care for, had decided to limit her family to this. However, despite the fact that the couple took "precautions", "contraception was a very imperfect art in the nineteenth century", and three more children were born over the next four years. Angelica Garnett describes Adrian, the last, as "an unwanted child [who] was spoiled, over protected and inhibited".

It was a happy marriage, as Leslie Stephen describes it, a "deep strong current of calm inward happiness". Of their children, he wrote "our own children were to her a pure delight. To see her with a baby on her breast was a revelation, and her love grew with their growth". The Stephens both had aristocratic connections, were considered to belong to the "intellectual aristocracy" and despite Leslie Stephen's obsession with money and fear of poverty, were quite well off financially. They belonged to a social strata of the well educated, who though not wealthy, had inherited sufficient resources to pursue their chosen vocations, a group that at the time was well defined. To many, the Stephens were the ideal Victorian parents, a leading man of letters and a woman admired for beauty, wit, bravery and self-sacrifice. He treated her as a goddess, and in return she pampered him. However, Julia informed him that she could never give up her nursing vocation, and that "I may be called away to nurse people for weeks or have invalids in my house for weeks".

In the early 1880s Leslie Stephen read Froude's life of Carlyle (1882). Like many of his contemporaries he was shocked to learn how badly (he considered) Carlyle had treated his wife, Jane Welsh and wondered if anyone would consider his marriage to have the same flaws, and indeed both shared the tendency to be domestic tyrants. Leslie, who had been a keen mountaineer in the 1860s, suffered a breakdown in 1888 connected with his work on the Dictionary of National Biography, necessitating a three-week visit by them to the Swiss Alps, an occasion documented by Leslie's friend Gabriel Loppé, including one of their particular favourites, in which Julia is peering out of a sunlit hotel room (see below). Laura Stephen became increasingly problematic with outbursts of violence and, confined to a separate part of the house, required her own nurse to feed and clothe her. Eventually she was sent away to a governess in Devon in 1886 and eventually an asylum (Earlswood Asylum 1893–1897 in Surrey). The family had little contact with her after that. In 1891, Vanessa and Virginia Stephen began the Hyde Park Gate News, chronicling life and events within the Stephen family, while the following year the Stephen sisters also used photography to supplement their insights, as did Stella Duckworth. Vanessa Bell's 1892 portrait of her sister and parents in the Library at Talland House (see image 5, below) was one of the family's favourites, and was written about lovingly in Leslie Stephen's memoir.

22 Hyde Park Gate 

Number 22 Hyde Park Gate, South Kensington, lay at the south east end of Hyde Park Gate, a narrow cul-de-sac running south from Kensington Road, just west of the Royal Albert Hall, and opposite Kensington Gardens and Hyde Park, where the family regularly took their walks (see Map). Built in the early nineteenth century as one of a row of single family townhouses for the upper middle class, it soon became too small for their expanding family. At the time of their marriage, it consisted of a basement, two storeys and an attic. In 1886 substantial renovations added a new top floor, converted the attic into rooms, and added the first bathroom. It was a tall but narrow townhouse, that at that time had no running water. The servants worked "downstairs" in the basement. The ground floor had a drawing room, separated by a curtain from the servant's pantry and a library. Above this on the first floor were Julia and Leslie's bedrooms. On the next floor were the Duckworth children's rooms, and above them the day and night nurseries of the Stephen children occupied two further floors. Finally in the attic, under the eaves, were the servant's bedrooms, accessed by a back staircase. The house was described as dimly lit and crowded with furniture and paintings. 
Within it the younger Stephens formed a close-knit group. Life in London differed sharply from that in Cornwall, their outdoor activities consisting mainly of walks in nearby Hyde Park, and their daily activities around their lessons.

Talland House (1882–1894) 

Leslie Stephen was in the habit of hiking in Cornwall, and in the spring of 1881 he came across a house in St Ives, and took out a lease on it that September. Although it had limited amenities, its main attraction was the view overlooking Porthminster Bay towards the Godrevy Lighthouse, which the young Virginia could see from the upper windows and which was to become the central figure in her novel To the Lighthouse (1927). It was a large, square house, with a terraced garden, divided by hedges, sloping down toward the sea. Each year between 1882 and 1894, from mid-July to mid-September, the Stephens leased Talland House as a summer residence. Leslie Stephen, who referred to it as "a pocket-paradise", described it as "The pleasantest of my memories... refer to our summers, all of which were passed in Cornwall, especially to the thirteen summers (1882-1894) at St Ives. There we bought the lease of Talland House: a small but roomy house, with a garden of an acre or two all up and down hill, with quaint little terraces divided by hedges of escallonia, a grape-house and kitchen-garden and a so-called ‘orchard’ beyond". It was in Leslie's words, a place of "intense domestic happiness". For the children it was the highlight of their year, Virginia Woolf later described a summer day in August 1890 in her diary (22 March 1921) with the cries of the children playing in the garden and the sound of the sea beyond, concluding that her life was "built on that, permeated by that: how much so I could never explain". The family did not return following Julia's death in May 1895.

In both London and Cornwall, Julia was perpetually entertaining, and was notorious for her manipulation of her guests' lives, constantly matchmaking in the belief everyone should be married, the domestic equivalence of her philanthropy. As her husband observed "My Julia was of course, though with all due reserve, a bit of a matchmaker". While Cornwall was supposed to be a summer respite, Julia Stephen soon immersed herself in the work of caring for the sick and poor there, as well as in London. 

Both at Hyde Park Gate and Talland House, the family mingled with much of the country's literary and artistic circles. Frequent guests included literary figures such as Henry James and George Meredith, as well as James Russell Lowell, and the children were exposed to much more intellectual conversations than their mother's at Little Holland House.

Julia and Leslie Stephen had four children;
 Vanessa "Nessa" (30 May 1879 – 1961), married Clive Bell
 Thoby (9 September 1880 – 1906), founded Bloomsbury Group
 Virginia "Jinny", "Ginia" (25 January 1882 – 1941), married Leonard Woolf
 Adrian (27 October 1883 – 1948), married Karin Costelloe

Relationships with family and household 

Much of what is known about Julia Stephen comes from the viewpoint of her husband, Leslie Stephen, and her daughter, Virginia Woolf, although the latter had only just turned thirteen when her mother died. Woolf, who stated that "for we think back through our mothers if we are women", invoked the image of her mother repeatedly throughout her life in her diary, her letters and a number of her autobiographical essays, including Reminiscences (1908), 22 Hyde Park Gate (1921) and A Sketch of the Past (1940), frequently evoking her memories with the words "I see her ...". She also alludes to her childhood in her fictional writing. In To The Lighthouse (1927) the artist, Lily Briscoe, attempts to paint Mrs Ramsay, a complex character based on Julia Stephen, and repeatedly comments on the fact that she was "astonishingly beautiful". Her depiction of the life of the Ramsays in the Hebrides is an only thinly disguised account of the Stephens in Cornwall and the Godrevy Lighthouse they would visit there. But Woolf's understanding of her mother and family evolved considerably between 1907 and 1940, in which the somewhat distant, yet revered figure becomes more nuanced and filled in. While Vanessa was slightly older at fifteen when her mother died, her recollections are provided in her daughter, Angelica Garnett's memoir.

As the youngest daughter, and last to marry, Julia was her mother's favourite daughter, in part due to her constant care of her mother who had many needs, and little time for maternal affection. With the premature death in 1881 of Maria Jackson's eldest daughter Adeline at 44, followed by that of her husband in 1887, she became increasingly hypochondriacal and an increasing demand on Julia's resources necessitated her making frequent visits to Sussex as well as caring for her mother in her Hyde Park Gate Home, where she died on 2 April 1892. By contrast, Leslie Stephen observed that her father was an unobtrusive presence and "somehow he did not seem to count".

Leslie Stephen writes about Julia "the noblest woman present" in tones of reverence in his Mausoleum Book, written for the children after her death. In that he was reminded of what was written about the Carlyles, and like Thomas Carlyle embarked on memorialising his wife. It was evident that he (and he was not alone in this) regarded her as a "beloved angel" and a saint, indeed as an agnostic, he had already sanctified her prior to their marriage, informing her that she replaced the Blessed Virgin. He describes her appearance as one in which her "beauty was of a kind which seems to imply—as most certainly did accompany—equal beauty of soul, refinement nobility, and tenderness of character". It is evident that she lived a life devoted both to her family and to the needs of others. Woolf drew a sharp distinction between her mother's work and "the mischievous philanthropy which other women practise so complacently and often with such disastrous results". She describes her degree of sympathy, engagement, judgement and decisiveness, and her sense of both irony and the absurd. She recalls trying to recapture "the clear round voice, or the sight of the beautiful figure, so upright and distinct, in its long shabby cloak, with the head held at a certain angle, so that the eye looked straight out at you". Julia's many domestic duties included sharing the education of the children with her husband. The girls were educated to a degree at home, while the boys were sent to private boys' boarding schools (known as public schools in the UK) and then university, as was the custom of the time. There was a small classroom off the back of the drawing room, with its many windows, which they found perfect for quiet writing and painting. Julia taught the children Latin, French and History, while Leslie taught them mathematics. They also received piano lessons.

Julia dealt with her husband's depressive moods and his need for attention, which created resentment in her children, boosted his self-confidence, nursed her parents in their final illness, and had many commitments outside the home that would eventually wear her down. Her frequent absences and the demands of her husband instilled a sense of insecurity in her children that had a lasting effect on her daughters. Amongst her family commitments, she cared for her mother during her long period of ill health, nursed her uncle Henry Prinsep when he was dying in 1878, and her sister Adeline who died in 1881. Leslie Stephen was also prone to bouts of ill health, suffering a breakdown from overwork in 1888–1889. Leslie Stephen describes how his constant self-deprecation, was intended to elicit Julia's sympathy and attention. In considering the demands on her mother, Woolf described her father as "fifteen years her elder, difficult, exacting, dependent on her" and reflected that this was at the expense of the amount of attention she could spare her young children, "a general presence rather than a particular person to a child", reflecting that she rarely ever spent a moment alone with her mother, "someone was always interrupting". Woolf was ambivalent about all this, yet eager to separate herself from this model of utter selflessness. She describes it as "boasting of her capacity to surround and protect, there was scarcely a shell of herself left for her to know herself by" At the same time she admired the strengths of her mother's womanly ideals. Given Julia's frequent absences and commitments, the young Stephen children became increasingly dependent on Stella Duckworth, who emulated her mother's selflessness, as Woolf wrote "Stella was always the beautiful attendant handmaid ... making it the central duty of her life". At the same time, Julia's relationship with Stella, who idolised her, was frequently problematic. As Julia confided to her husband, she was especially hard on her eldest daughter because she considered her part of herself.

Julia greatly admired her husband's intellect, and although she knew her own mind, thought little of her own. As Woolf observed "she never belittled her own works, thinking them, if properly discharged, of equal, though other, importance with her husband's". She believed with certainty in her role as the centre of her activities, and the person who held everything together, with a firm sense of what was important and valuing devotion. Of the two parents, Julia's "nervous energy dominated the family". While Virginia identified most closely with her father, Vanessa stated her mother was her favourite parent. Angelica Garnett recalls how Virginia asked Vanessa which parent she preferred, although Vanessa considered it a question that "one ought not to ask", she was unequivocal in answering "Mother" Stella, the oldest daughter, led a life of total subservience to her mother, incorporating her ideals of love and service. Virginia quickly learned, that like her father, being ill was the only reliable way of gaining the attention of her mother, who prided herself on her sickroom nursing. Against this background of over committed and distant parents, suggestions that this was a dysfunctional family must be evaluated. These include evidence of sexual abuse of the Stephen girls by their older Duckworth halfbrothers, and by their cousin, James Kenneth Stephen (1859–1892), at least of Stella. Laura is also thought to have been abused. The most graphic account is by Louise DeSalvo, but other authors and reviewers have been more cautious.  Other issues the children had to deal with was Leslie Stephen's temper, Woolf describing him as "the tyrant father".

Julia's grandson, Quentin Bell (1910–1996) describes her as saintly, with a certain gravitas derived from sorrow, playful and tender with her children, sympathetic to the poor and sick or otherwise afflicted, and always called upon at times of need as a ministering angel. As he adds, "because of this one cannot quite believe in her". Yet a close reading of Leslie Stephen's memoir reveals cracks in the image of the perfection of both Julia and the marriage. Woolf's more balanced assessment seems more realistic than her father's idealised version, but her family's assessments also need to be balanced by the picture that emerges from Julia's own writings. In contrast, Vanessa maintained her idealised version of her mother, passing it on to her own daughter. Ultimately the demands on her selflessness and her tireless efforts on behalf of others became too much and started to take their toll. Like her husband (and eventually her daughters), she suffered from depression, and has been described as "haunted, worn down and beautiful" as captured, somewhat controversially, by Rothenstein's drawings of her in the 1890s, shown here. Woolf, like all the family, greatly admired her mother's beauty, and so strong was her conviction she could not accept what Rothenstein depicted, "my mother was more beautiful than you show her".

Running a large household, in a towering Victorian mansion and with many commitments outside the home necessitated the supervision of the family finances and management of a large number of domestic servants, as would be common then, and indeed indispensable in such a lifestyle. This would be the subject of two of her essays. So strong were some of these ties, that Sophie Farrell, who came to work at 22 Hyde Park Gate in 1886, would continue to work for various members of the extended Stephen family for the rest of her life. Woolf provides us with a picture of her mother "adding up the weekly books". Nevertheless, it was a household run by a woman for a man, Julia believing that a woman's role was ultimately to serve her husband.

Death 

On 5 May 1895, Julia died at her home, of heart failure brought on by influenza at the age of 49. She left her husband with four young children aged 11 to 15 (her children by her first marriage being adults, although Stella, then 26, took over her mother's duties till she was married two years later). Julia was buried on 8 May at Highgate Cemetery, where her husband, daughter Stella and son Thoby were also later interred. Julia's wealth at her death is listed as £5483 17s 1d.

Work

Artist's model 

Julia Stephen is best known for being a model, not only of Pre-Raphaelite painters, but also her photographer aunt, Julia Margaret Cameron. She was Julia Margaret Cameron's favourite and most trusted and mutable model, (see Gallery II) documenting her moods and meditations. Cameron was fascinated to a degree of obsession by Julia, with over 50 portraits, more than any other subject. Julia's legacy is the image Cameron portrayed in her earlier days, the fragile ethereal figure with large soulful eyes and long wild hair. Most of Cameron's photographs of Julia were taken between 1864 and 1875, including a series of profiles in the spring of 1867, two of which were during her period of engagement (plates 310–311), in which Cameron portrayed Julia's cool puritan beauty as a metaphor for the symbolic place of marriage, that Cameron called "the real nobility I prize above all things". Here Cameron frames the bust with emphatic side lighting that accentuates the tautness in the swanlike neck and the strength in the head, indicating heroism and stateliness as befits a girl on the verge of matrimony. By placing the subject facing into the light, the photographer illuminates her and suggests a forthcoming enlightenment.

Cameron frequently used a soft focus such as Julia Duckworth 1867 (plate 311) here. One of these portraits she titled My Favorite Picture of all my works. In this her eyes, are downcast and averted from the lens, a more sentimental effect than the dramatic frontal view of My niece Julia full face shown here. In this portrait, the subject appears to stare assertively at the photographer, as if saying: "I am, like you, my own woman." These are in sharp contrast to the series taken during her long widowhood and mourning for her first husband (1870–1878), with its gaunt pallid facial features. Again, Cameron draws on another Victorian symbol, this time the tragic heroine whose beauty is consumed in grief.

Social activism and philanthropy 

In addition to her tireless contributions to running the Stephen household, and attending to the needs of her relatives, she worked to support friends and supplicants. She had a strong sense of social justice, travelling around London by bus, nursing the sick in hospitals and workhouses. She would later write about her nursing experience in her Notes from Sick Rooms (1883). This is a discussion of good nursing practices, demonstrating fine attention to detail. A notable passage is her description of the misery caused by bread crumbs in the bed. In addition to dispensing practical nursing advice, she undertook social advocacy on the part of the sick and poor. She published a letter of protest on behalf of the inmates at St George's Union Workhouse in Fulham "for giving in to the temperance movement and cutting off the half-pint of beer". This ration allocated to the pauper women there had been removed at the insistence of the temperance campaigners (Pall Mall Gazette, 4 October 1879). This was an institution she visited regularly. She also wrote an impassioned defence of  agnostic women (Agnostic Women, 8 September 1880), arguing against claims that agnosticism was incompatible with spirituality and philanthropy (see Quotations). She also drew on her experience of ministering to the sick and dying in making these arguments.

At home, Virginia Woolf describes how Julia used one side of the drawing room for dispensing advice and consolation, the "angel in the house".

Views 

Julia held firm views on the role of women in society. She was not a feminist, and has been described as an antifeminist, lending her name to the anti-suffrage movement in 1889. The novelist Mary Ward (1851–1920) and the Oxford Liberal set collected the names of the most prominent intellectual aristocracy, including Julia's friend Octavia Hill (1838–1912), and nearly a hundred other women to sign a petition "An Appeal Against Female Suffrage" in Nineteenth Century in June of that year. This earned her a rebuke from George Meredith, writing facetiously "for it would be to accuse you of the fatuousness of a Liberal Unionist to charge the true Mrs Leslie with this irrational obstructiveness", pretending that the signature must belong to another woman of the same name. Rather, Julia Stephen believed that women had their own role and their own role models. She referred her daughters to Florence Nightingale (1820–1910), Octavia Hill and Mary Ward  as models. Her views on the role of women in society are firmly laid out in her Agnostic Women, namely that while men and women may operate in separate spheres, their work is of equal value. However, Julia's views on women and feminism need to be evaluated within the historical and cultural context in which she lived, being thoroughly an upper middle class Victorian woman. In her particular case the "separate spheres" were reversed from the post-industrial convention of the time, Leslie Stephen working from home while she worked outside of the home. Julia and her husband's views on this were very much in keeping with the predominant ethos of the time, agreeing with "the vast majority of their contemporaries— that men and women played different roles in life, roles conditioned by their physiology as well as their education". Despite this separation within the spheres of public and private life, she advocated for professionalism and competence by women within these, a viewpoint becoming more common in her time, and exemplified by her nursing activities.

Nor did her views preclude friendship with passionate advocates for women's rights and suffrage, such as the actress Elizabeth Robins. Robins recalls that her Madonna like face was somewhat misleading "she was a mixture of the Madonna and a woman of the world" and that when she came up with something more worldly, it was "so unexpected from that Madonna face, one thought it vicious". Julia Stephens was, in most respects, a conventional Victorian lady. She defended the hierarchical system of the live-in servants, the need to keep a constant watch over them, and believed a "strong bond" existed between the mistress of the house and those who serve. It was this conventionality that Woolf consciously separated herself from, in terms of a model of womanhood, with the Victorian expectations of social conformity, that Woolf described as "a machine into which our rebellious bodies were inserted".

Publications and other writings 

Julia Stephen's literary canon consists of a book, a collection of children's stories and a number of unpublished essays. The first was a small volume, entitled Notes from Sick Rooms, published by her husband's publisher, Smith, Elder & Co. in October 1883, an account of her nursing experience together with a detailed manual of instruction. It was republished in 1980 and later published in conjunction with Virginia Woolf's On Being Ill (1926) in 2012. The second is a collection of stories she told to her children, entitled Stories for Children and written between 1880 and 1884. Her stories tended to promote the value of family life and the importance of being kind to animals. Sometimes, such as in Cat's Meat, they reflect the tensions in Julia's own life. She emerges from these writings as decisive, conservative, and pragmatic, with a wit that some considered almost shocking. Although she was unsuccessful in getting these published in her lifetime, they were eventually published, together with Notes from Sick Rooms and a collection of her essays, which had been in the possession of Quentin Bell, in 1993. She also wrote the biographical entry for Julia Margaret Cameron in the Dictionary of National Biography of which her husband was the first editor (1885–1891), one of the very few biographies of women to be found in this work, and an omission which drew the critical exclamation of Woolf "it is much to be regretted that no lives of maids ... are to be found in the Dictionary of National Biography". Among her essays was Agnostic women defending her philanthropy as an agnostic (see Social activism and Views), and two other essays addressing the management of households, and in particular servants.

List of publications 

 
 
 
 
  (Notes from Sick Rooms also in ), see also Excerpt
 
 
 
 
 , in

Quotations

Legacy 

Julia Stephen was the mother of Bloomsbury. She has been described as an austerely beautiful muse of the Pre-Raphaelites, and her physical image comes down to us through countless paintings and photographs. George Watt's portrait of Julia (1875), originally hung in Leslie Stephen's study at Hyde Park Gate, later it was in Duncan Grant's studio at 22 Fitzroy Square for some time, and then at Vanessa Bell's Charleston Farmhouse in Sussex, where it still hangs. The family owned a number of the Julia Margaret Cameron portraits of Julia Stephen. After Leslie Stephen's death in 1904, 22 Hyde Park Gate was sold and the children moved to 46 Gordon Square, Bloomsbury, where they hung 5 of these on the right hand side of the entrance hall. Later, when her granddaughter Angelica Garnett moved into the Charleston Farmhouse in 1987, she hung them in the passageway. Other images come from the photographs of family and friends. These images formed an important link with their prematurely dead mother, for her children. Writing to her sister in 1908, Vanessa Bell refers to her wish to "gaze at the most beautiful of Aunt Julia's photographs incessantly". Otherwise, her image has been described as "elusive", for we know her largely through the construction of others, principally Leslie Stephen and Virginia Woolf, each with their own filters. As Lowe observes, Julia Stephen has been variously constructed as "Madonna", "Nurse", "Wife", "Mother" and "Phantom".

Quentin Bell considers her importance measured not so much in herself as in her influence on others. This was also the position taken by Leslie Stephen at the time of her death. Many of her children, and their descendants in turn, became notable. She played a part in the development of English thought and letters at the close of the nineteenth century. Julia Stephen conformed to the Victorian male image of the ideal woman, virtuous, beautiful, capable and accommodating, symbolised in Burne-Jones' Annunciation. Her conception of life was something she conveyed to her children with great effect. Baron Annan goes so far as to point out resemblances in literary style between her writing in Notes for Sickrooms, and that of Virginia Woolf. Although Julia's daughters rejected their Victorian heritage, their mother's influence appears in Woolf's low chignon  hairstyle and wearing her mother's dress in Vogue in May 1926 (see image). Vanessa Bell too, would appear in one of her mother's dresses, such as the portrait of her by Duncan Grant (see image). Woolf also wrote with her mother's pen.

Throughout her life, Julia Stephen was a prodigious letter writer, and according to Leslie Stephen, during her mother's lifetime, they "never passed a day apart without exchanging letters", often several. After her death, The Julia Prinsep Stephen Nursing Association Fund was established to commemorate the life of a woman, Leslie Stephen described as one whose "frank kindly ways made her many friends among the poor".

Virginia Woolf 

The intense scrutiny of Virginia Woolf's literary output (see Bibliography) has inevitably led to speculation as to her mother's influence, including psychoanalytic studies of mother and daughter. Woolf states that "my first memory, and in fact it is the most important of all my memories" is of her mother. Her memories of her mother are memories of an obsession and she suffered her first major breakdown on her mother's death in 1895, the loss having a profound lifelong effect. In many ways, her mother's profound influence on Virginia Woolf is conveyed in the latter's recollections, "there she is; beautiful, emphatic ... closer than any of the living are, lighting our random lives as with a burning torch, infinitely noble and delightful to her children". Woolf described her mother as an "invisible presence" in her life, and Rosenman argues that the mother-daughter relationships is a constant in Woolf's writing. She describes how Woolf's modernism needs to be viewed in relationship to her ambivalence towards her Victorian mother, the centre of the former's female identity, and her voyage to her own sense of autonomy. To Woolf, "Saint Julia" was both a martyr whose perfectionism was intimidating and a source of deprivation, by her absences real and virtual and premature death. Julia's influence and memory pervades Woolf's life and work, "she has haunted me", she wrote.

Family trees 

|

Notes

References

Bibliography

Books and theses 

 
 
 
 
 
 
 
 
  see also Survey of London

Julia Margaret Cameron 

  (Digital edition)
 
  (see also Getty Publications Virtual Library)
 
 
  also available through MOMA here

Leslie Stephen 

 
 
 
 
 
 
 Review.  John W. Bicknell Victorian Studies 1994
  (exceepts also at Google Books
 
  (excerpts in 
  (see also Dictionary of National Biography)

Vanessa Bell

Virginia Woolf and Bloomsbury 

 
 
 
 
 
 
 
 
 
  see also excerpt here
 
 
 
 
 
 
 
 
 
 
  (excerpt - Chapter 1)
 
 
 
 
 
 
 
 
 
 
 
 
 
 
 
  additional excerpt

Works by Virginia Woolf 

  (see A Room of One's Own)
  (see  Moments of Being)

 , in 
 , in 
 
 
 
 , in 
  (full text) see also Three Guineas
  see also To the Lighthouse
 Texts at Woolf Online 

 Collections

Biography (other) 

 
 
 
 
 }
  (additional excerpts)
 
 
 
 
 
 
 
 
 
 
  also Internet archive

Chapters and contributions 

 , in 
 , in 
 , in 
 , in 
 , in 
 , in 
 , in 
 , in 
 , in 
 , in 
 , in 
 , in 
 , reprinted in

Articles

Websites 

 
 
 
 
 
 
 
 
 
 
 

 Genealogy
 
 
 
 , in 
 , in 
 

Virginia Woolf

Images 

 
 
 
 
 
 
 
 
 , in 
 
 
 
 

 Collections

Notes

References

External links 

1846 births
1895 deaths
Pre-Raphaelite Brotherhood artists' models
Virginia Woolf
English agnostics
Stephen-Bell family
19th-century women writers
People from Frant
People from Kolkata